Neoantistea agilis is a species of true spider in the family Hahniidae. It is found in the United States and Canada.

References

External links

 

Hahniidae
Articles created by Qbugbot
Spiders described in 1887